The Sweden men's national under-20 basketball team is a national basketball team of Sweden, administered by the Swedish Basketball Federation. It represents the country in international men's under-20 basketball competitions.

FIBA U20 European Championship participations

See also
Sweden men's national basketball team
Sweden men's national under-18 basketball team
Sweden women's national under-20 basketball team

References

External links
Archived records of Sweden team participations

Basketball in Sweden
Basketball
Men's national under-20 basketball teams